Parakrama Pandyan II, also Pandu Parakramabahu of Polonnaruwa or Parakrama Pandu, was a Pandyan king who invaded the Kingdom of Polonnaruwa in the thirteenth century and ruled from 1212 to 1215 CE. His namesake royal Parakrama Pandyan I had ruled in Madurai fifty years earlier and had sought help from his contemporary Parakramabahu I of Polonnaruwa when faced with a Pandyan civil war. Parakrama Pandyan II came to the throne deposing Lilavati—ruling monarch, consort and successor of Parakramabahu I—as king of Polonnaruwa. He ruled for three years until Polonnaruwa was invaded and he was taken captive by Kalinga Magha, who succeeded him.

See also
 Pandyan Dynasty
 List of Sri Lankan monarchs
 History of Sri Lanka

References

External links
 Kings & Rulers of Sri Lanka
 Codrington's Short History of Ceylon

Pandyan kings
Monarchs of Polonnaruwa
Usurpers of the Sinhalese throne
P